is a type of pickled vegetable in Japan. Like other forms of kasuzuke, the vegetables are pickled in softened sake lees (sake kasu) with salt, sugar, and mirin and then used to pickle salted vegetables. The distinguishing feature of karashizuke is the addition of mustard to the lees.

Nasu Karashizuke (eggplant pickled in mustard and sake lees) is a popular type of karashizuke.

External links

 Japanese Food / Tsukemono (pickles)
 kyuri no kirashizuke (cucumber kirashizuke) recipe

Japanese pickles